The 2004 Golden Spin of Zagreb was the 37th edition of an annual senior-level international figure skating competition held in Zagreb, Croatia. It was held at the Dom Sportova between November 11 and 14, 2004. Figure skaters competed in the disciplines of men's singles, ladies' singles, and ice dancing. The Junior-level equivalent was the 2004 Golden Bear of Zagreb.

Results

Men

Ladies

Ice dancing

External links
 2004 Golden Spin of Zagreb results

Golden Spin Of Zagreb, 2004
Golden Spin of Zagreb
2000s in Zagreb
Golden Spin Of Zagreb, 2004